This is a list of films produced in the Netherlands during the 1980s. The films are produced in the Dutch language.

References 

1980s
Films
Dutch